Tillandsia chapeuensis is a species in the genus Tillandsia. This species is native to Brazil.

References

chapeuensis
Flora of Brazil